Flexiseps meva is a species of skink endemic to Madagascar.

References

Reptiles of Madagascar
Reptiles described in 2011
Flexiseps